Ebola Syndrome (伊波拉病毒) is a 1996 Hong Kong Category III exploitation film starring Anthony Wong and directed by Herman Yau.

Plot
Ah Kai is a wanted convict from Hong Kong who escapes to South Africa after killing his former boss and his boss's wife. In South Africa, he works at a Chinese restaurant and one day travels with his boss to a South African tribe that is infected with the Ebola virus. Kai sees a dying infected tribe member and rapes and kills her, contracting the virus. Kai, however, is immune to the infection.  He becomes a living carrier, spreading the disease to others through body fluids. He ends up killing his new boss and his boss's wife, but not before spreading the virus to them.  He then cuts up their corpses and serves them as hamburgers in the restaurant, effectively spreading the virus all over South Africa. He then further spreads the virus when he flees back to Hong Kong, to all the people he has contact with.

Cast

Release
Ebola Syndrome was released in Hong Kong on 15 June 1996.

References

External links

1996 horror films
1996 films
1990s Cantonese-language films
Ebola in popular culture
1990s exploitation films
Films about viral outbreaks
Films directed by Herman Yau
Crime horror films
Hong Kong comedy horror films
Hong Kong crime comedy films
Discotek Media
Hong Kong splatter films
1990s English-language films
1990s Hong Kong films